Prunum pyrumoides is a species of sea snail, a marine gastropod mollusk in the family Marginellidae, the margin snails.

Description

Distribution

References

 Lussi M. & Smith G. (1999) Family Marginellidae Fleming, 1828. New species belonging to the family Marginellidae from off South Africa. Malacologia Mostra Mondiale 29: 10–15.page(s): 11

Marginellidae
Gastropods described in 1999